Federico Varano (born 31 January 1995) is an Italian professional footballer who plays for Italian club Chieri.

Club career

Atalanta
Born in Vigevano, Lombardy, Varano started his career at Lombard club Atalanta. He was part of the squad for the play-off round of 2013–14 Campionato Nazionale Primavera. On 16 July 2014 Varano graduated from their youth system and joined Serie C club Venezia, along with Simone Magnaghi.

Cesena
In July 2015, Cesena signed Federico Varano and Moussa Koné from Atalanta for a total transfer fee of €6 million, as part of a cashless swap which Luca Valzania moved to Atalanta from Cesena also for €6M fee on 30 June. Cesena also signed Mattia Caldara and Salvatore Molina on temporary basis from Atalanta as part of the deal. Varano signed a four-year contract. He was assigned number 20 shirt.

Varano failed to enter the first team lineup in the first half of 2015–16 Serie B season. On 29 January 2016 he moved to Serie C club Arezzo. On 20 July 2016, Varano left for another Serie C club Pistoiese.

On 12 July 2017 Varano returned to Cesena for their 2017 pre-season camp.

Mantova
On 29 November 2018, he joined Serie D club Mantova.

Career statistics

References

External links
 

Italian footballers
Italy youth international footballers
Atalanta B.C. players
Venezia F.C. players
A.C. Cesena players
S.S. Arezzo players
U.S. Pistoiese 1921 players
Alma Juventus Fano 1906 players
Mantova 1911 players
Serie C players
Serie D players
Association football forwards
Footballers from Lombardy
Sportspeople from the Province of Pavia
1995 births
Living people